Jure Bogdan (born in Donji Dolac near Omiš, 9 November 1955) is a Croatian bishop who serves as 2nd Military ordinary of Croatia since February 27, 2016, had previously served as a rector of Pontifical Croatian College of St. Jerome.

Early life and education
Jure Bogdan was born in a small village of Donji Dolac near Omiš on November 9, 1955, to Ivan and Perka Bogdan. He attended elementary school in Donji Dolac from 1961 to 1969, after which he attended minor seminary in Split during which he finished Classical gymnasium in the year 1973. After graduation, he enrolled in the Catholic Theological Faculty of the University of Split from which he graduated theology and philosophy on May 16, 1980. During his studies, Bogdan served as a senior prefect of Split archdiocesan seminary from January 1977 to autumn 1979. Bogdan was ordained as a deacon for Archdiocese of Split-Makarska by Archbishop Frane Franić in Split cathedral on June 24, 1979. Archbishop Franić ordained him for priest on June 22, 1980.

Career
Bogdan celebrated his first Mass in Donji Dolac on July 6, 1980. After that, he served as a parish vicar in the parish of St. Nicholas in Metković from August 15, 1980, to August 15, 1984. From August 1984 to September 1992, he was a spiritual leader at the Split archdiocesan seminary. Bogdan was also Vice President of Council for Youth, and the presiding judge for vocations in his Archdiocese. He also served as a secretary of Council for seminaries of the Bishops' Conference of Yugoslavia.

In autumn of 1992, Bogdan was sent by Archbishop Ante Jurić to attend study of pastoral theology at the Pontifical Lateran University in Rome. He gained his master's degree in October 1994 with the mentorship of Bishop Marcello Semeraro, after which he gained his Ph.D. on June 22, 1999. with thesis "Vita Universale: Cristianesimo delle origini o nuova rivelazione? Riflessioni teologico-pastorali" (Universal Life: Originally Christianity or new revelation? Theological-pastoral reflection). His mentor was prof. Michael Fuss.

At the proposal of the Croatian bishops, Prefect of the Congregation for Catholic Education, Cardinal Pio Laghi appointed Bogdan on December 2, 1996, to the position of rector of the Pontifical Croatian College of St. Jerome. The appointment was announced on December 19, 1996, while Bogdan took office on January 25, 1997. In addition, Cardinal Camillo Ruini appointed Bogdan as a rector of Saint Jerome of the Croats church. Besides this, Bogdan served two terms, both, as a secretary, and president of the Association of the Rectors of the Roman Pontifical Institutes (Associazione dei Rettori dei College ecclesiastic di Roma). He spent 19 years as a rector under three Popes, John Paul II, Pope Benedict XVI and Francis. Bogdan is the postulator of Blessed Miroslav Bulešić.

Pope Francis has named Bogdan new bishop and Military Ordinary of Croatia on November 30, 2015. He was consecrated on February 27, 2016, by archbishop Marin Barišić, with co-consecrators being cardinal  Josip Bozanić, and bishop Juraj Jezerinac, his predecessor.

Bibliography
Bogdan is the author of several scientific articles. He also edited several books including the collection of works about  Institute of St. Jerome that was published on the occasion of the celebration of the centennial of the modern Institute of St. Jerome (1901-2001).

References

Roman Catholic bishops in Croatia
Croatian theologians
1955 births
Living people
Bishops appointed by Pope Francis